National Institute of Local Government (জাতীয় স্থানীয় সরকার ইনস্টিটিউট) is a government  training and research institute that is responsible for training officials, both elected and appointed, of local government in Bangladesh and is located in Agargaon, Dhaka, Bangladesh. It is under the Local Government Division of the Ministry of Local Government, Rural Development and Co-operatives.

History
In 1965 the government of Pakistan decided to establish a local government training institute in East Pakistan. A United States Agency for International Development consultant was appointed in 1967 to do a feasibility study. On 1 July 1969 the government of Pakistan established the Local government institute. The Government of Bangladesh reformed the local government institute into the National Institute of Local Government in 1980. It is governed by a board of directors formed under National Institute of Local Government Law, 1992.

References

Research institutes in Bangladesh
1980 establishments in Bangladesh
Educational organisations based in Bangladesh
Rural development in Bangladesh
Organisations based in Dhaka